The Colorado Rockies are a Major League Baseball (MLB) franchise based in Denver, Colorado. They play in the National League West division.  The Rockies have participated in MLB's annual June draft since 1992. Officially known as the "First-Year Player Draft", the Rule 4 Draft is MLB's primary mechanism for assigning players from high schools, colleges, and other amateur clubs to its franchises. The draft order is determined based on the previous season's standings, with the team possessing the worst record receiving the first pick. In addition, teams which lost free agents in the previous off-season may be awarded compensatory or supplementary picks. Since the franchise was established as an expansion team in 1992, the Rockies have selected 31 players in the first round. The First-Year Player Draft is unrelated to the 1992 expansion draft through which the Rockies filled their roster.

Of the 31 players selected in the first round by the Rockies, 18 have been pitchers, the most of any position; 12 of these have been right handed, and 6 have been left-handed.  The Rockies have also selected six outfielders, four shortstops, and one player each at catcher, first base, and third base.  The Rockies have never selected a second baseman in the first round. The Rockies have drafted 16 players out of high school, and 14 out of college. Colorado has drafted seven players from high schools or colleges in the state of California, with five coming from Texas and three from Tennessee. The Rockies' 2002 selection—Jeff Francis—is the only selection from outside the United States.

None of the Rockies' first-round picks have won a World Series championship with the team, and no pick has been elected to the Hall of Fame. The Rockies' first-round selection in 1999—Jason Jennings—won the MLB Rookie of the Year award with the franchise in 2002, his first full season in the Major Leagues.  Todd Helton—the Rockies' 1995 selection—has won four Silver Slugger Awards and three Gold Gloves, as well as being named to five All-Star teams. Casey Weathers, the Rockies' 2007 selection, won a bronze medal in baseball with the United States team at the 2008 Summer Olympics. The Rockies have never held the first overall pick in the draft, but held the second overall pick once, which they used in 2006 to select Greg Reynolds.

The Rockies have received nine compensatory picks, including seven selections made in the supplemental round of the draft since the franchise's first draft in 1992. These additional picks are provided when a team loses a particularly valuable free agent in the previous off-season, or, more recently, if a team fails to sign a draft pick from the previous year.  The Rockies have failed to sign their first round pick only once—2000 selection Matt Harrington—for which they received the 44th overall pick in the 2001 draft.

Key

Picks

See also
 Colorado Rockies minor league players

Footnotes
 Through the 2012 draft, free agents were evaluated by the Elias Sports Bureau and rated "Type A", "Type B", or not compensation-eligible. If a team offered arbitration to a player but that player refused and subsequently signed with another team, the original team was able to receive additional draft picks. If a "Type A" free agent left in this way, his previous team received a supplemental pick and a compensatory pick from the team with which he signed. If a "Type B" free agent left in this way, his previous team received only a supplemental pick. Since the 2013 draft, free agents are no longer classified by type; instead, compensatory picks are only awarded if the team offered its free agent a contract worth at least the average of the 125 current richest MLB contracts. However, if the free agent's last team acquired the player in a trade during the last year of his contract, it is ineligible to receive compensatory picks for that player.
  The Rockies lost their original first-round pick in 1998 to the Houston Astros as compensation for signing free agent Darryl Kile.  The lost pick was the 17th overall selection.
  The Rockies gained a compensatory first-round pick in 1998 from the Atlanta Braves for losing free agent Andrés Galarraga.
  The Rockies gained a supplemental first-round pick in 1998 for losing free agent Andrés Galarraga.
  The Rockies gained a supplemental first-round pick in 1998 for losing free agent Walt Weiss.
  The Rockies lost their original first-round pick in 2001 to the New York Mets as compensation for signing free agent Mike Hampton.  The lost pick was the 17th overall selection.
  The Rockies gained a supplemental first-round pick in 2001 for failing to sign draft pick Matt Harrington.
  Although Baseball-Reference shows Francis being drafted from the University of Lethbridge, MLB.com and several other media outlets report him as having been drafted out of the University of British Columbia.
  The Rockies gained a supplemental first-round pick in 2005 for losing free agent Vinny Castilla.
  The Rockies gained a compensatory first-round pick in 2009 from the Los Angeles Angels of Anaheim for losing free agent Brian Fuentes.
  The Rockies gained a supplemental first-round pick in 2009 for losing free agent Brian Fuentes.
  The Rockies gained a supplemental first-round pick in 2010 for losing free agent Jason Marquis.
  The Rockies gained a supplemental first-round pick in 2011 for losing free agent Octavio Dotel.
  The Rockies gained a supplemental first-round pick in 2012 for losing free agent Mark Ellis.
   The Rockies gained a supplemental first-round pick in 2015 for losing free agent Michael Cuddyer.

References
General references
 
 
In-text citations

First-round draft picks
Colorado Rockies first-round draft picks